City quality of life indices are lists of cities that are ranked according to a defined measure of living conditions. In addition to considering the provision of clean water, clean air, adequate food and shelter, many indexes also measure more subjective elements including a city's capacity to generate a sense of community and offer hospitable settings for all, especially young people, to develop social skills, a sense of autonomy and identity. 

Regions with cities commonly ranked in the top 50 include the United States, Canada, Western Europe, Australia, and New Zealand. Three examples of such surveys are Monocle's "Quality of Life Survey", the Economist Intelligence Unit's "Global Liveability Ranking", and "Mercer Quality of Living Survey". Numbeo has the largest statistics and survey data based on cities and countries. Deutsche Bank's Liveability Survey is another ranking of cities by quality of life.

The EIU's Global Liveability Ranking

The Economist Intelligence Unit's (EIU) publishes an annual Global Liveability Ranking, which ranks 140 cities for their urban quality of life based on assessments of their stability, healthcare, culture, environment, education and infrastructure.

Melbourne, Australia, had been ranked by the EIU as the world's most livable city for seven years in a row, from 2011 to 2017. Between 2004 and 2010, Vancouver, Canada, was ranked the EIU's most livable city, with Melbourne sharing first place in the inaugural 2002 report. Vancouver has ranked third since 2015, while Vienna, Austria, ranked second until 2018 when it climbed to the top spot.

The Syrian capital, Damascus, was ranked the least livable city of the 140 assessed in 2021 and 2022.

The EIU also publishes a Worldwide Cost of Living Survey that compares the cost of living in a range of global cities.

Monocle's Quality of Life Survey
Since 2006, the lifestyle magazine Monocle has published an annual list of livable cities. The list in 2008 was named "The Most Livable Cities Index" and presented 20 top locations for quality of life.

Important criteria in this survey are safety/crime, international connectivity, climate/sunshine, quality of architecture, public transport, tolerance, environmental issues and access to nature, urban design, business conditions, proactive policy developments and medical care.

The 2022 Monocle Survey determined the world's most livable city was Copenhagen, followed by Zurich, Lisbon and Helsinki.

Global Finance's World's Best Cities to Live  
Global Finance is an English-language monthly financial magazine that publishes a list of the world's best cities to live that is based on a score that reflects a comprehensive list of eight unique factors. These are: economic strength; research and development; cultural interaction; livability; environment; accessibility; GDP per capita (nominal in U.S. dollars); and COVID-19 deaths per million for the country.

Mercer's Quality of Living Ranking
American global human resources and related financial services consulting firm Mercer annually releases its Mercer Quality of Living Survey, comparing 221 cities based on 39 criteria. New York City is given a baseline score of 100 and other cities are rated in comparison. Important criteria are safety, education, hygiene, health care, culture, environment, recreation, political-economic stability, public transport and access to goods and services. The list is intended to help multinational companies decide where to open offices or plants, and how much to pay employees. Mercer has ranked Austria's capital Vienna first in its annual "Quality of Living" survey since 2009.

The full ranking includes 231 cities.

Deutsche Bank Liveability Survey 
The 2019 survey showed the following cities to be highest in quality of life, for numerous reasons (e.g. style, affordability, happiness and pollution etc.):

Numbeo's Quality of Life Ranking
Numbeo is a crowd-sourced global database of reported consumer prices, perceived crime rates, quality of health care, among other statistics.

The full ranking includes 251 cities.

See also
 European Green Capital Award
 Healthy city
 List of most expensive cities for expatriate employees
 List of largest cities
 Urban vitality

References

Cities-related lists of superlatives
Market research
Quality of life
The Economist
liveable
International quality of life rankings